The Amherst Area Chamber of Commerce is the local chamber of commerce for portions of Hampshire and Franklin counties within the Pioneer Valley of  Massachusetts. The chamber represents the business needs of over 600 businesses and 4,200 employees in the area.

Chamber model
The Amherst Area Chamber is supported by members' dues and its own fundraising activities. Membership is open to anyone and dues are based upon a sliding scale based on the number of employees. The Chamber is a partner organization with the Greater Northampton Chamber and Greater Easthampton Chamber in the formation and management of the Hampshire County Regional Tourism Council.

The Amherst Area Chamber of Commerce is divided into Councils, with each Council being an advocate for different interests of the members or responsible for the hosting of various chamber events throughout the year.

Member benefits
The chamber offers benefits to businesses once they become members. They include services in the areas of marketing, advertising, educational support, ribbon cutting ceremonies, referrals, networking, business advocacy, special discounts and group buying power.

Issues
The Amherst Area Chamber supported the ban on disposable food and drink containers made from expanded polystyrene (commonly called Styrofoam) beginning on January 1, 2014, in the town of Amherst. The chamber hoped that prices for alternative containers would go down for local restaurants affected businesses as paper-based containers become more popular.

Events
The annual Taste of Amherst is one of the most popular events that the Amherst Area Chamber of Commerce hosts. It draws over 20,000 people to eat at over 20 local restaurants that set up tents on the Amherst town common. There are also bounce houses and face painting for children and a beer tent for adults. The Taste of Amherst has had a large effort in the past few years to "green up the event". All of the plates and silverware are made of compostable materials. There are three stations where patrons bring their trash to be sorted into recycling, compost, and waste.

Example members

Example legislative members

References

External links
 Official Website of Amherst Area Chamber of Commerce
 Official Website for the Town of Amherst

Chambers of commerce in the United States
Amherst, Massachusetts
1956 establishments in Massachusetts